Bay Ward or Ward 7 (French: Quartier Baie) is a municipal ward in Ottawa, Ontario, Canada represented on Ottawa City Council. It covers much of the western portion of the old city of Ottawa as well as some portions of what was once Nepean. The ward runs from Sherbourne and Maitland in the east to March Road in the west. The southern border is the Queensway while the northern border is the Ottawa River. The ward makes up the northern portion of the federal and provincial riding of Ottawa West-Nepean.

The ward contains a number of neighbourhoods, with quite diverse populations. Some of the neighbourhoods in the ward are Bayshore, Woodroffe North, Michele Heights, Glabar Park, Lincoln Heights, Britannia, and Crystal Beach. The westernmost part of the ward also contains a large section of the Greenbelt. Some of these neighbourhoods, especially those by the Ottawa River are quite wealthy. However, there are also many much poorer parts of the ward with many residents living in high-density apartments. The ward also contains some of Ottawa's highest concentrations of recent immigrants.

From the creation of the new city of Ottawa in 2001 to 2010 the ward was represented by former MPP Alex Cullen, who was considered to be one of the most left-wing members of city council. However, Bay Ward has voted Liberal in recent provincial elections and Conservative federally. In the 2003 and 2006 elections, Cullen faced strong challenges from conservative opponents. In the 2003 election he faced John Blatherwick, while in 2006 he fended off a challenge from high-profile former mayoral candidate Terry Kilrea. In 2010, Cullen was defeated by a Liberal, Mark Taylor.

Bay Ward was the home of former mayor Bob Chiarelli, and he won the area by large margins in both the 2000 and 2003 mayoral elections. In the 2006 mayoral election, however, the area supported Larry O'Brien and Chiarelli finished third, also behind Alex Munter. In the 2010 mayoral election, Bay Ward swung back to the centre, going for Jim Watson.

The ward is a descendant of Britannia-Richmond Ward, which included the area now in Bay Ward before Ottawa amalgamated in 2001. That ward was created in 1994 when Britannia Ward merged with Richmond Ward. The ward existed on Regional Council as Bay Ward from 1994 until the region dissolved. This area was part of Carleton Ward until 1972 when it became Britannia Ward. Richmond Ward was carved out of it in 1980 and existed until merging back with the original ward in 1994.

Following the 2020 Ottawa Ward boundary review, the ward will gain the neighbourhoods of McKellar Heights and McKellar Park.

City councillors
Marion Dewar (1973-1974), Britannia
Sandy Boyce (1975-1976), Britannia
Marlene Catterall (1977-1985), Britannia
Ruth Wildgen (1986-1988), Britannia
Jim Jones (1989-1991), Britannia
Jill Brown (1992-1994), Britannia 
Ron Kolbus (1995-2000), Britannia-Richmond
Alex Cullen (2001-2010), Bay
Mark Taylor (2010–2018), Bay
Theresa Kavanagh (2018–present), Bay

Election results

1972

1974

1976

1978

1980

1982

1985

1988

1991

1994

1997

2000

2003

2006

2010

2014

2018

2022

References

External links
 Map of Bay Ward

Ottawa wards